"Vohon chy lid (Vse ne te)" is a pop song recorded by Ukrainian popsinger Ruslana, written by her and Oleksander Ksenofotov and co-produced by Ruslana herself. The song serves as the third single (second radio single) from her March 2008-released Ukrainian album Amazonka.

The music video for "Vohon chy lid" has been finished and was premiered on the 2 November 2008. A 1-minute teaser video has leaked onto YouTube in mid-September.

2008 singles
Ruslana songs
2008 songs
Songs written by Ruslana
Ukrainian-language songs